Itzaes de Yucatan F.C is a Mexican football club that plays in the Tercera División de México. The club is based in Yucatan, Mexico.

History
The club was founded in 1981 as Mayas due to the city's Maya heritage, playing in the Tercera División de México. The club would reach its First Final in 1989 against Furia Azul del Ayense. The final was played in Estadio Carlos Iturralde, where the club went on to lose the game.

The club would not reach another final until 2007 when this time they were defeated by Atlético Cihuatlan.

The club has played in the Tercera División de México since its first game in 1981 and is still fighting for a spot in the Segunda División de México.

See also
Football in Mexico

Honors
Tercera División de México (0):
Runner Up (2) 1981,2007

References

External links
Official Page

Association football clubs established in 1981
Football clubs in Yucatán
1981 establishments in Mexico